This article shows the rosters of all participating teams at the 2019 FIVB Volleyball Women's U20 World Championship in México.

The following is the Argentinian roster in the 2019 FIVB Volleyball Women's U20 World Championship.

Head coach: Guillermo Caceres

The following is the Brazilian roster in the 2019 FIVB Volleyball Women's U20 World Championship.

Head coach: Cabral de Oliveira

The following is the Chinese roster in the 2019 FIVB Volleyball Women's U20 World Championship.

Head coach: Hairong Shi

The following is the Cuban roster in the 2019 FIVB Volleyball Women's U20 World Championship.

Head coach: Tomas Fernandez Arteaga

The following is the Dominican roster in the 2019 FIVB Volleyball Women's U20 World Championship.

Head coach: Wagner Pacheco

The following is the Egyptian roster in the 2019 FIVB Volleyball Women's U20 World Championship.

Head coach: Ahmed Mohamed

The following is the Italian roster in the 2019 FIVB Volleyball Women's U20 World Championship.

Head coach: Massimo Bellano

The following is the Japanese roster for the 2019 FIVB Volleyball Women's U20 World Championship.

Head coach: Noboru Aihara

The following is the Mexican roster for the 2019 FIVB Volleyball Women's U20 World Championship.

Head coach: Luis Leon

The following is the Peruvian roster for the 2019 FIVB Volleyball Women's U20 World Championship.

Head coach: Natalia Málaga Dibos

The following is the Polish roster for the 2019 FIVB Volleyball Women's U20 World Championship.

Head coach: Waldemar Kawka

The following is the Russian roster in the 2019 FIVB Volleyball Women's U20 World Championship.

Head coach: Igor Kurnosov

The following is the Rwandan roster in the 2019 FIVB Volleyball Women's U20 World Championship.

Head coach: Christophe Mudahinyuka

The following is the Serbian roster in the 2019 FIVB Volleyball Women's U20 World Championship.

Head coach: Marijana Boricic

The following is the Turkish roster in the 2019 FIVB Volleyball Women's U20 World Championship.

Head coach: Çatma Şahin

The following is the American roster in the 2019 FIVB Volleyball Women's U20 World Championship.

Head coach: Jerritt Elliott

References

External links
  Official website

FIVB Volleyball Women's U20 World Championship
FIVB Women's U20 World Championship
FIVB Volleyball World Championship squads